Rose Hill is a historic home located at Guilderland in Albany County, New York.  It was built about 1840 and is a two-story Federal style dwelling.  It has a hipped roof crowned by a balustrade and symmetrically placed chimneys. It features a central front porch with Latticework decoration.  It was built by Volkert Veeder, agent for Stephen Van Rensselaer and active worker in colonizing the town.  Also on the property is a barn, privy, and shed.

It was listed on the National Register of Historic Places in 1982.

References

Houses on the National Register of Historic Places in New York (state)
Houses completed in 1800
Federal architecture in New York (state)
Houses in Albany County, New York
National Register of Historic Places in Albany County, New York